Gordon William Francis Lyon (22 May 1905 – 22 December 1932) was an English first-class cricketer and educator.

Lyon was born in May 1905 at Bradford-on-Avon, Wiltshire. He was educated at Brighton College, before going up to Wadham College, Oxford. While studying at Oxford, he played first-class cricket for Oxford University, making his debut against the Free Foresters at Oxford in 1925. He played first-class cricket for Oxford until 1927, making nine appearances. Lyon scored a total of 262 runs in his nine matches, at an average of 16.37 and a high score of 52.

After graduating from Oxford, Lyon became a schoolmaster. He died in Sussex at Steyning in December 1932, leaving Brighton College Scholarship Trustees £2,068.

References

External links

1905 births
1932 deaths
People from Bradford-on-Avon
People educated at Brighton College
Alumni of Wadham College, Oxford
English cricketers
Oxford University cricketers
Schoolteachers from Sussex